Angela Catterns,  (born 30 September 1953) is an Australian media personality and broadcaster. Mostly known for her work on Australian radio, she has presented Mornings on Triple J, the National Evening Show on ABC Local Radio, and Breakfast on 702 ABC Sydney. She is also a podcaster, writer, interviewer, MC, facilitator, narrator & voice over artist. She presented with Australian humourist and broadcaster Wendy Harmer a holiday season version of the Breakfast Show on 702 ABC Sydney.

During her time at 702 Sydney first presenting 'Breakfast', Catterns temporarily displaced prominent Australian radio broadcaster Alan Jones in 2004 to achieve number one in the listener survey ratings. Catterns has also held broadcasting roles at Australian commercial radio stations 2SM and Vega 95.3 in Sydney, 2UE and at WKYS in Washington DC. Her popularity as a radio broadcaster is often attributed to her "perfectly measured combination of intellect and personality", her listening and interviewing skills, and a voice described as being "smooth as chocolate" (The Sydney Morning Herald) or "as if her vocal cords have been marinated overnight in plum brandy and golden syrup" (Elle Magazine).

In 2003, Catterns conceived the ABC 702 'Knit-In', harnessing the knitting prowess and goodwill of 702 listeners, in collaboration with the charity Wrap with Love, for an annual knitting event at ABC Headquarters. The 'Knit-In' has been an annual ABC event ever since. In addition to her involvement with Wrap With Love, Catterns is an ambassador, volunteer and supporter of the charity Habitat for Humanity Australia and The Public Education Foundation.

Early career
Following high school and a diploma in advertising from Sydney Technical College, Catterns began her career as an advertising copywriter, working in-house at department stores Hordern's and Farmers in Sydney, leading to a stint at Surry Hills-based ad. agency, W.B. Lawrence & Partners.

Though Sydney born and bred, Catterns made several forays into Australia's regional areas after her earlier city-based career. For example, her first job as a radio announcer was at 2LM, in the north coast town of Lismore, NSW. Around this time, Catterns had several of her original poems published in an anthology of Australian women's poetry, the controversial Mother I'm Rooted, edited by Kate Jennings. After living and working in Lismore, Catterns headed to Orange, NSW for her first job working in television, at the area's CBN 8 channel. Catterns also worked as a voiceover artist at this time for the Orange radio station 2GZ.

After several years in Orange, Catterns returned to Sydney and immediately travelled overseas as a sound recordist for a documentary shot in Papua New Guinea.

In 1979, Catterns landed the high-profile position as one of the first four reporters on the popular children's Logie award-winning television show, Simon Townsend's Wonder World. The series was known for its fun and creative reporting style, though it tackled more serious issues from time to time.

Mid career
Catterns left Wonder World to travel, and on returning to Australia, she produced the film documentary "Double Concerto" about the Australian pianist Roger Woodward and Polish violinist Wanda Wilkomirska. The film won several AFI Awards (for cinematography and editing) and was screened on ABC TV as well as at the New York Film Festival.

In the mid-1980s, Catterns joined the ABC youth network, Triple J, as producer and then presenter of the morning show for the then Sydney-only radio station. She left Triple J for a short stint on commercial radio to present mornings on 2SM. Catterns was controversially sacked from 2SM after just ten months for unconvincing reasons, later saying herself, "I was told I was too intelligent for our audience and that women don't like listening to other women on radio".

Following 2SM, Catterns spent time working at SBS Television as a researcher and producer, before leaving for the US to pursue a long-held ambition to work in American radio. Catterns landed an on-air shift at the top rating WKYS in Washington DC, a popular station best known for its soul and R&B music programming.

Returning to Australia, Catterns rejoined Triple J as the full-time morning show announcer. Triple J had begun to broadcast nationally and had also just launched its long-running "Unearthed" initiative. At Triple J, Catterns aired a selection of memorable and popular interviews with subjects like David Bowie, Michael Hutchence, Jeff Buckley and then Prime Minister Paul Keating. Catterns went on to host Triple J's drive program before making the move to ABC Local Radio, presenting the evening program across Australia (from the ABC Studios in Lismore, returning to one of her favourite spots on the NSW north coast).
In between full-time radio positions, Catterns freelanced and during the 2000 Summer Olympics in Sydney, she was the "voice of the Olympics", responsible for all the public domain announcements at Sydney Olympic Park. Catterns was also venue announcer at the Superdome for the Sydney 2000 Olympic Gymnastics competition.

In addition to being involved in the early online radio venture, BigFatRadio, around this time Catterns also became the voice of the safety announcements for pre-flight procedures on all Qantas flights – and after more than a decade, still scripts, programs and presents 'Soul Food', an enduring in-flight Qantas music channel.

2001 to present
In 2001, Catterns returned once again to the ABC, this time to ABC Local Radio, or what she refers to as "the grown up ABC". Catterns became the 702 ABC Sydney breakfast presenter and went on to become the number one Sydney breakfast presenter in the December 2004 ratings survey, temporarily overtaking the popular Alan Jones from 2GB.

As one article at the time put it, Catterns was offering something different to the dominant 2GB and 2UE breakfast shows, and appealed to a younger demographic of 30- to 59-year-olds: "702's mix of warm, intelligent Sydney talk and good music, uninterrupted by advertising and wrapped around a solid digest of ABC news and current affairs, is a hard combination to beat".
In 2001, Catterns and the marketing department of ABC Local Radio conceived and initiated an event called the KNIT IN.  Because she was making scarves for her father and daughter, Catterns had been discussing knitting on her breakfast show. This led to a flood of listener interest, and the KNIT IN went on to become an annual event where the station encourages knitters and crafters to help support the charity Wrap with Love's pledge to provide warm wraps for people suffering from extreme cold.

Catterns resigned from ABC 702 in June 2005 after more than four years presenting breakfast radio. Two months later she joined Sydney's FM station Vega 95.3 as the breakfast presenter. After two years, in October 2007, Catterns announced that she was leaving Vega 95.3, staying with the station until the end of the ratings period on 24 November.

Catterns hosted the inaugural AIR Awards of 2006.

More recently, Catterns has been working with Wendy Harmer, a friend and colleague from her time at Vega. The pair produced several series of podcasts, including "Is it Just Me?", "It's News to Me" and "In the Loop". In the summer of 2009, 2010 and 2011, Catterns and Harmer got together to present the Breakfast Show on 702 ABC Sydney. As Harmer said about the pair working together in a Sydney Morning Herald article: "That laugh! Well, everyone in Sydney loves that laugh… Ange teaches me to listen. Her take on the world is honest, challenging and refreshing. (So) I resolved to work with this chick!" In the same article, Catterns echoed the sentiment: "It's some of the most enjoyable and rewarding work I've ever done… (we're) almost certainly the first two women ever to share the early morning duties (on Australian radio). Wendy makes me own up to things I've been too shy or embarrassed to talk about. For some reason, I find I'm unable to lie to Wendy!".

In 2011, she stepped out from behind the microphone and spent several months in the role of Program Director at 774 ABC Melbourne.

In January 2014, Catterns joined 2UE as a presenter of the Morning show. She remained with the station until Fairfax Radio merged with Macquarie Radio.

In April 2020, Catterns returned to ABC Local Radio to host Saturday Breakfast on Lismore-based ABC North Coast. At the same time, she launched a national Sunday Afternoon show.

Catterns continues to freelance as a recognised voice-over artist, interviewer and presenter, also bringing her experience to clients as an events MC, hosting proceedings for numerous conferences, corporate events and charity fund-raisers. 
She writes short stories, occasional feature articles and is currently writing a collection of memoirs from her career.
She is also an independent producer of podcasts.  Catterns is the voice of the Sydney Opera House gently coaxing patrons to take their seats.

Media and colleagues
Various colleagues and media commentators have offered an interpretation for the enduring popularity of broadcaster Catterns.
Journalist Bryce Corbett said: "Her smooth voiced sincerity seems to invite confidence and listeners who call her do so to have a chat with their mate Angela, rather than share themselves and their thoughts with a national audience… Encouraging listeners to speak their minds is something Angela Catterns does best".

Catterns' one time breakfast radio competitor Mike Carlton from 2UE said: "Angela Catterns is serious competition. She's also very good." In the same The Daily Telegraph article, her then-manager at ABC local radio, Roger Summerill described Catterns as "a woman who is intelligent and entertaining and providing Sydney radio audiences with exactly what they want: a thought-provoking, well informed and highly entertaining program for people who are interested in what's going on in the world".

In a feature article for Elle Magazine, colleague Sharon Longridge said, "Aside from being sophisticated and insightful, Catterns is a genuinely inclusive broadcaster. She is interested in her listeners. Add to that a level of warmth that makes her audience believe she is their individual friend and you have a recipe for creating loyalty." In the same article, ABC colleague and reporter Steve Cannane added, "One of her most notable attributes is that she really listens to whoever she's talking to. She's not from the 'look at me' school of broadcasting… instead, she draws things out of her interview subjects".

Catterns also offers her own thoughts about her motivations, talking here about working with ABC Radio: "After all, 702 is the Sydney station that reflects the interests and aspirations of its people. What I love is being able to connect with the audience, seeing the switchboard light up and know you've struck a chord".

Honours
In the 2014 Queen's Birthday Honours, Catterns was appointed a Member of the Order of Australia (AM) for "significant service to the broadcast media industry as a radio presenter, and to social welfare organisations".

Personal life
Catterns is the daughter of Basil Catterns – an Australian businessman, amateur yachtsman and citizen soldier who won the Military Cross for his acts of bravery on the Kokoda Track. She also has a child of her own. Speaking about her father in an article she wrote for the Sydney Morning Herald, Catterns said:

Outside of her career, Catterns enjoys sailing, yoga, reading, writing and working with charities such as Habitat for Humanity.

References

External links
Angela Catterns' website

1955 births
Living people
Members of the Order of Australia
People from Sydney
Triple J announcers
Australian women radio presenters